Joseph Edward Bland, also known as J. Edward Bland, (May 5, 1866October 2, 1945) was a Michigan politician.

Early life and education
Bland was born on May 5, 1866 in London, Ontario, Canada. Bland's parents were of an Irish branch of an English family. Bland was educated in the United States. He went to public school and business college before attending the University of Michigan Law School. There, Bland earned a Bachelor of Laws, and a Master of Laws degree in 1896.

Career
Bland practiced law in Detroit. At some point, Bland had a few years' residency in California. Bland enlisted into the United States Navy during the Spanish–American War. He was on the crew of the USS Yosemite. After his time in the navy, Bland remained active in the naval militia. On November 6, 1900, Bland was elected to the Michigan House of Representatives where he represented the Wayne County 1st district from January 1, 1901 to January 1, 1903. He served another term from January 1, 1905 to January 1, 1907. In the state house, from 1905 to 1906, Bland was the chair of the committee on game laws. In the book The Men of '05, editor Harry M. Nimmo criticized Bland's ability to regulate gambling properly due to Bland's gambling tendencies. Nimmo then expressed that Bland was one to fight for the common man as opposed to the wealthy, citing Bland's demand to regulate electric rail fares. On November 6, 1906, Bland was elected to the Michigan Senate where represented the 3rd district from January 1, 1907 to January 1, 1909.

Personal life
Bland was unmarried by the time of his second term in the state house in 1905. This fact is poked fun at in Harry M. Nimmo's book, The Men of '05.

Death
Bland died on October 2, 1945, in Lakeland, Florida.

References

1866 births
1945 deaths
American militiamen
United States Navy personnel of the Spanish–American War
American people of Irish descent
Canadian emigrants to the United States
Lawyers from Detroit
Republican Party members of the Michigan House of Representatives
Republican Party Michigan state senators
Military personnel from Michigan
Politicians from Detroit
University of Michigan alumni
20th-century American politicians